Yuriy Mykolayovych Vakulko (born 10 November 1997) is a Ukrainian professional footballer who play for Riga.

Club career

Dnipro
He made his debut for FC Dnipro in the match against FC Volyn Lutsk on 24 July 2016 in the Ukrainian Premier League scoring one of the goals in a 5–0 win.

Partizan
On 23 January 2018, after passing medical tests, Vakulko came into agreement with Serbian club Partizan Belgrade and signed a four-year contract. He was officially presented the next day and was given the number 14 shirt.

Loan to Arsenal Kyiv
On 3 September 2018, he joined Ukraine Premier League club Arsenal Kyiv on loan.

Riga
In summer 2021 he moved to Latvian side Riga FC.

International career
After representing Ukraine at under-19 level, Vakulko became a regular at the under-21 level.

Honours
Riga FC
 Latvian Higher League: Runner-up 2022

Partizan
 Serbian Cup: 2017–18
 Serbian SuperLiga: Runner-Up 2017–18

Dnipro
UEFA Europa League Runners-up: 2014–15

References

External links
 

1997 births
Living people
Footballers from Odesa
Ukrainian footballers
FC Dnipro players
Ukrainian Premier League players
Ukrainian Second League players
FK Partizan players
Serbian SuperLiga players
Expatriate footballers in Serbia
Association football midfielders
Ukrainian expatriate footballers
Ukrainian expatriate sportspeople in Serbia
FC Arsenal Kyiv players
SC Dnipro-1 players
Riga FC players
Latvian Higher League players
Expatriate footballers in Latvia
Ukrainian expatriate sportspeople in Latvia
Ukraine under-21 international footballers
Ukraine youth international footballers